Tommy Wilson is an American former Negro league shortstop who played in the 1940s.

Wilson played for the Philadelphia Stars in 1948. In three recorded games, he posted one hit and one RBI in seven plate appearances.

References

External links
 and Seamheads

Year of birth missing
Place of birth missing
Philadelphia Stars players
Baseball shortstops